João Cunha e Silva (also known as João Cunha-Silva; born 27 November 1967) is a former professional tennis player from Portugal.  He won two doubles titles during his career on the ATP Tour.  He reached his career-high doubles ranking of world No. 72 in March 1989.

Cunha e Silva holds several records for the Portugal Davis Cup team, including most singles wins, most total wins, most ties played, and most years played.

He is currently coaching Tour player Frederico Gil at the CETO - Clube Escola de Ténis de Oeiras (Oeiras Tennis School Club) as well as João Domingues.

Career finals

Doubles: 4 (2–2)

Awards
2013 – ITF Commitment Award

References

External links
 
 
 

1967 births
Living people
Portuguese male tennis players
Portuguese tennis coaches
Sportspeople from Lisbon